{{Infobox person
| name        = Roger Hearing
| image       = 
| caption     =
| birthname   = 
| birth_date  = 
| birth_place = London
| death_date  =
| death_place =
| education   = Hardye's School, DorsetDowning College, CambridgeCity University London
| occupation  = Journalist, Broadcaster
| alias       =
| status      = 
| title       =
| family      =
| spouse      = 
| children    = 
| relatives   =
| credits     = The World TodayNewshour
| URL         =
}}

Roger Hearing is a journalist and former news presenter.  Previously Hearing worked as a presenter on the BBC World Service and at Bloomberg Radio.

Early life
Hearing was born in London and brought up in west Dorset.

Education
Hearing was educated at Hardye's School, a state grammar school (now a comprehensive school and renamed The Thomas Hardye School), in the market town of Dorchester in Dorset; he then attended Downing College, Cambridge and City University London.

Life and career
Hearing's career in journalism began with the Birmingham Post; he joined the BBC World Service in 1987. During the course of his career with the World Service, he has reported from such countries as Zambia, Iraq, Burma, Azerbaijan, India and Peru. Since 1999, he has presented The World Today, Newshour and other World Service programmes. Hearing was also heard on BBC Radio 4 as a relief presenter on The World Tonight.

He has covered such important events as the civil wars in Angola and Mozambique, the build-up to the first Gulf War, the UN intervention in Somalia, and the genocide in Rwanda.

He left Bloomberg Radio in 2022, and returned to BBC World Service programming presenting regularly on Business Matters and World Business Report. He also presents a weekly current affairs podcast, The Why? Curve with Phil Dobbie.

References

External links
 BBC presenter profile.
 Roger Hearing's diary in The Guardian''.

Living people
BBC newsreaders and journalists
BBC World Service people
People educated at Hardye's School
Year of birth missing (living people)